Calliostoma atlantis, common name the Atlantis top shell, is a species of sea snail, a marine gastropod mollusk in the family Calliostomatidae.

Distribution
This species occurs in the Caribbean Sea and the Gulf of Mexico; in the Atlantic Ocean off the Bahamas at depths of about 600 m. They can also be found in Atlantis

Description 
The maximum recorded shell length is 33 mm.

Habitat 
Minimum recorded depth is 604 m. Maximum recorded depth is 628 m.

References

 Clench, W. J. and C. G. Aguayo. 1940. Notes and descriptions of new deep-water Mollusca obtained by the Harvard-Habana Expedition off Cuba. III. Memorias de la Sociedad Cubana de Historia Natural "Felipe Poey" 14: 77–94, pls. 14–16

atlantis
Gastropods described in 1940